David Grogan (7 July 1914 – March 1993) was a British water polo player who competed in the 1936 Summer Olympics.

He was part of the British team which finished eighth in the 1936 tournament. He played five matches.

External links
profile

1914 births
1993 deaths
British male water polo players
Olympic water polo players of Great Britain
Water polo players at the 1936 Summer Olympics